Nizhal Thedum Nenjangal is a 1982 Indian Tamil-language film directed and photographed by P. S. Nivas. The film stars Rajeev, Vijayashanti and Vadivukkarasi. It was released on 14 November 1982.

Plot

Cast 
 Rajeev
 Vijayashanti
 Vadivukkarasi

Soundtrack 
The music was composed by Ilaiyaraaja.

Reception 
Kalki said Nivas' cinematography was better than his directing skills.

References

External links 

1980s Tamil-language films
1982 films
Films scored by Ilaiyaraaja